The Oklahoma State Cowboys football statistical leaders are individual statistical leaders of the Oklahoma State Cowboys football program in various categories, including passing, rushing, receiving, total offense, defensive stats, kicking, and scoring. Within those areas, the lists identify single-game, single-season, and career leaders. The Cowboys represent Oklahoma State University–Stillwater in the NCAA Division I FBS Big 12 Conference.

Although Oklahoma State began competing in intercollegiate football in 1901, the school's official record book considers the "modern era" to have begun in 1945. Records from before this year are often incomplete and inconsistent, and they are generally not included in these lists.

These lists are dominated by more recent players for several reasons:
 Since 1945, seasons have increased from 10 games to 11 and then 12 games in length.
 The NCAA didn't allow freshmen to play varsity football until 1972 (with the exception of the World War II years), allowing players to have four-year careers.
 The Cowboys have played in 26 bowl games in their history, with 14 of them coming since 2002. While the NCAA didn't count bowl game statistics until 2002, and most schools follow this policy, Oklahoma State's official records count all bowl game statistics. This means that while the NCAA recognizes Barry Sanders' single-season rushing yards record of 2,628 as the national record, Oklahoma State counts his stats from the 1988 Holiday Bowl as well and recognizes the record as 2,850 yards.
 Oklahoma State played in the Big 12 Championship Game in 2021, giving players in that season yet another game to accumulate statistics.
 Due to COVID-19 issues, the NCAA declared that the 2020 season would not count against the athletic eligibility of any football player, thus giving every player active in that season the opportunity for five years of eligibility instead of the normal four.

These lists are updated through the 2021 Big 12 Championship Game.

Passing

Passing yards

Passing touchdowns

Rushing

Rushing yards

Rushing touchdowns

Receiving

Receptions

Receiving yards

Receiving touchdowns

Total offense
Total offense is the sum of passing and rushing statistics. It does not include receiving or returns.

Total offense yards

Touchdowns responsible for
"Touchdowns responsible for" is the NCAA's official term for combined passing and rushing touchdowns. Oklahoma State's 2021 media guide uses this specific term, and does not list official single-game leaders in this statistic.

Defense

Interceptions

Tackles

Sacks

Kicking

Field goals made

Field goal percentage
Minimum of 15 career attempts and 10 single-season attempts.

Scoring

Points

Touchdowns
In official NCAA statistics, touchdown totals include touchdowns scored. Accordingly, these lists include rushing, receiving, and return touchdowns, but not passing touchdowns.

References

Oklahoma State